Prince Norodom Yuvaneath (17 October 1943 – 13 January 2021) was the first son of the late king of Cambodia, Norodom Sihanouk and Princess Sisowath Pongsanmoni.  He was the half-brother of the current king, Norodom Sihamoni.

Personal life
Norodom Yuvaneath was educated by the Lycée Sisowath. He spoke French and English in addition to his native Khmer.

In 1957, under the direction of his socialist-leaning father, who was at the time the current king's son (that is, a prince), and the de facto leader of Cambodia, the Ankar Khamarak Kayarith was transformed into the "Royal Socialist Khmer Youth". Sihanouk himself served as president of this state-run organization, then controlled by the Royal government. The 2,000 members and the leaders of Cambodian Scouting were permitted by the government to carry on activities. Scouts and Scout leaders attended the World Jamboree in 1959 in the Philippines, among them was Prince Norodom Yuvaneath. Soon after, Sihanouk announced the dissolution of the Cambodian Boy Scout Association, whose members were subsequently integrated into the JSRK, a government sponsored youth movement.

Norodom Yuvaneath married Tea Kim Yin in June 1962.  In 1970 after the coup by General Lon Nol that abolished the monarchy, Yuvaneath's family fled to Beijing, where they lived until 1975, when Yuvaneath moved his family to Hong Kong. In 1980, he and his family moved again to Connecticut in the United States.

Government
In 1993, after the Vietnamese left Cambodia, King Norodom Sihanouk returned to Cambodia and re-established the monarchy. On 31 December of that year, he elevated Prince Yuvaneath to the rank of Sdech Krom Luon, appointing him privy counsellor to His Majesty the King, a rank equal to that of deputy prime minister. After King Sihanouk abdicated, the new king Norodom Sihamoni, Yuvaneath's younger stepbrother, appointed Yuvaneath the supreme royal advisor. In this capacity, Yuvaneath proclaimed his opposition to the tribunal of former Khmer Rouge leaders, believing that the 1975-1979 turmoil resulting in the massacre of over two million Cambodians was a result of foreign intervention by the Vietnamese and Thai governments.  Yuvaneath also stated his belief that a trial would be contrary to the interests of national reconciliation. Yuvaneath was also a Commander of the Royal Order of Monisaraphon.

Death
Yuvaneath died of illness at Branford, Connecticut, United States on 13 January 2021. He was 77 years old when he died.

Notes

References

External links
Norodom Family Home Page Wedding pictures of H.H. Prince Veakchearavouth's marriage ceremony, 2001

1943 births
2021 deaths
Cambodian princes
House of Norodom
Scouting and Guiding in Cambodia
Children of prime ministers of Cambodia
People from Phnom Penh
Members of the Royal Order of Monisaraphon
Sons of kings